Hapana milloti is a species of moth of the family Thyrididae. It is found in Madagascar.

They have a wing length between 7.5 and 9.5 mm. Externally this species is very similar to Hapana verticalis: the main difference of this species is that it is lacking the tarsal spines.

References
 Viette, P. 1954j. Nouveaux Thyrididae de Madagascar (Lep.). - Bulletin de la Société entomologique de France 59:118–122.

Thyrididae
Moths described in 1954
Moths of Madagascar
Moths of Africa